Zail was a revenue and administrative unit, extending between forty and hundred villages, under an officer in charge Zaildar in the colonial rural administration of Punjab in British India. The system was abolished in 1952.

Demarcation of Zail
Each Tehsil was subdivided in to several Zails. Zail was a grouping of villages. Tehsils, zails and village were headed by the tehsildar, zaildar and muqaddam. Mqaddam was usually a prominent chaudhury who was appointed as numbardar of the village, villages with large revenue land had more than one numberdar. Zail were established and demarcated by the District collector during the land revenue settlement exercise. Settlement officer, with advice from the District collector and by the final approval of the state's Financial Commissioner, appointed a Zaildar to each Zail, who were equivalent to the Chaudharis (feudal zamindars) of earlier times and were hand-picked  by the deputy-commissioner, who based his decision on issues such as caste or tribe, local influence, extent of landholding, services rendered to the state by him or his family, and personal character and ability.

Revenue from Zail
Zaildar collected the revenue from the cluster of villages under him and passed it to the British raj district collectors, Zaildars were remunerated for their duties with life grants of either fixed amount or grant equal to one per cent of the revenue of their zails from the assessment of any single village that they chose.

Impact and Legacy of Zaildari System
Zails and Zaildari system extended the influence of the colonial state right into the villages.

Abolishment
Post Indian independence in 1947, the system of Zails, Zaildars and Safedposh continued to exist till 1948 but were finally abolished in 1952 by the Government of India.

See also

 List of Zaildars by Zail
 Indian feudalism
 Indian honorifics
 Gram panchayat
 Jagirdar
 Mankari
 Lambardar
 Sarpanch
 Zaildar
 Zamindar
 Jat

References

History of Punjab, India
History of Haryana